Well-being, or wellbeing, also known as wellness, prudential value or quality of life, refers to what is intrinsically valuable relative to someone. So the well-being of a person is what is ultimately good for this person, what is in the self-interest of this person. Well-being can refer to both positive and negative well-being. In its positive sense, it is sometimes contrasted with ill-being as its opposite. The term "subjective well-being" denotes how people experience and evaluate their lives, usually measured in relation to self-reported well-being obtained through questionnaires.

For a long time, wellbeing has been treated as a variable from none to a high degree of wellbeing. This usage of wellbeing has in later times been widened to also include a negative aspect of wellbeing. With the aim of understanding how different route environmental variables affect the wellbeing during walking or cycling, the term "environmental unwellbeing" has been coined.

Overview
Sometimes different types of well-being are distinguished, such as mental well-being, physical well-being, economic well-being or emotional well-being. The different forms of well-being are often closely interlinked. For example, improved physical well-being (e.g., by reducing or ceasing an addiction) is associated with improved emotional well-being. As for another example, better economic well-being (e.g., possessing more wealth) tends to be associated with better emotional well-being even in adverse situations such as the COVID-19 pandemic. Well-being plays a central role in ethics since what we ought to do depends, at least to some degree, on what would make someone's life get better or worse. According to welfarism, there are no other values besides well-being.

The terms well-being, pleasure and happiness are used in overlapping ways in everyday language, but their meanings tend to come apart in technical contexts like philosophy or psychology. Pleasure refers to experience that feels good and is usually seen as one constituent of well-being. But there may be other factors, such as health, virtue, knowledge or the fulfillment of desires. Happiness for example, often seen either as "the individual’s balance of pleasant over unpleasant experience" or as the state of being satisfied with one's life as a whole, is also commonly taken to be a constituent of well-being.

Theories of well-being try to determine what is essential to all forms of well-being. Hedonistic theories equate well-being with the balance of pleasure over pain. Desire theories hold that well-being consists in desire-satisfaction: the higher the number of satisfied desires, the higher the well-being. Objective list theories state that a person's well-being depends on a list of factors that may include both subjective and objective elements.

Well-being is the central subject of positive psychology, whose goal is to discover the factors that contribute to human well-being. Martin Seligman, for example, suggests that these factors consist in having positive emotions, being engaged in an activity, having good relationships with other people, finding meaning in one's life and a sense of accomplishment in the pursuit of one's goals.

The Oxford English Dictionary traces the term well-being to a 16th-century calque of the Italian concept benessere.

Theories of well-being 
The well-being of a person is what is good for the person. Theories of well-being try to determine which features of a state are responsible for this state contributing to the person's well-being. Theories of well-being are often classified into hedonistic theories, desire theories, and objective list theories. Hedonistic theories and desire theories are subjective theories. According to them, the degree of well-being of a person depends on the subjective mental states and attitudes of this person. Objective list theories, on the other hand, allow that things can benefit a person independent of that person's subjective attitudes towards these things.

For hedonistic theories, the mental states in question are experiences of pleasure and pain. One example of such an account can be found in Jeremy Bentham's works, where it is suggested that the value of experiences only depends on their duration and the intensity of pleasure or pain present in them. Various counterexamples have been formulated against this view. They usually involve cases in which common-sense suggests that options with a lower aggregate pleasure are preferable, for example, that the intellectual or aesthetic pleasures are superior to sensory pleasures or that it would be unwise to enter Robert Nozick's experience machine. These counter-examples are not knock-down arguments but the proponent of hedonistic theories faces the challenge of explaining why common-sense misleads us in the problematic cases.

Desire theories can avoid some of the problems of hedonistic theories by holding that well-being consists in desire-satisfaction: the higher the number of satisfied desires, the higher the well-being. One problem for some versions of desire theory is that not all desires are good: some desires may even have terrible consequences for the agent. Desire theorists have tried to avoid this objection by holding that what matters are not actual desires but the desires the agent would have if she was fully informed.

Objective list theories state that a person's well-being depends on a variety of basic objective goods. These goods may also include subjective factors like a pleasure-pain-balance or desire-satisfaction besides factors that are independent of the subject's attitudes, like friendship or having virtues. Objective list theories face the problem of explaining how subject-independent factors can determine a person's well-being even if this person doesn't care about these factors. Another objection concerns the selection of these factors. Different theorists have provided very different combinations of basic objective goods. These groupings seem to constitute arbitrary selections unless a clear criterion could be provided why all and only the items within their selections are relevant factors.

Scientific approaches
Three subdisciplines in psychology are critical for the study of psychological well-being:
 Developmental psychology, in which psychological well-being may be analyzed in terms of a pattern of growth across the lifespan.
 Personality psychology, in which it is possible to apply Maslow's concept of self-actualization, Rogers' concept of the fully functioning person, Jung's concept of individuation, and Allport's concept of maturity to account for psychological well-being.
 Clinical psychology, in which well-being consists of biological, psychological and social needs being met.

According to Corey Keyes' five-component model, social well-being is constituted by the following factors:
 social integration,
 social contribution,
 social coherence,
 social actualization,
 social acceptance.

There are two approaches typically taken to understand psychological well-being:
 Distinguishing positive and negative effects and defining optimal psychological well-being and happiness as a balance between the two.
 Emphasizes life satisfaction as the key indicator of psychological well-being.

According to Guttman and Levy (1982) well-being is "...a special case of attitude". This approach serves two purposes in the study of well-being: "developing and testing a [systematic] theory for the structure of [interrelationships] among varieties of well-being, and integration of well-being theory with the ongoing cumulative theory  development in the fields of attitude of related research".

Models and components of well-being

Many different models have been developed.

Causal Network Models of Well-being (and Ill-being)

Philosopher Michael Bishop developed a causal network account of well-being in The Good Life: Unifying the Philosophy and Psychology of Well-being. The causal network account holds that well-being is the product of many factors—feelings, beliefs, motivations, habits, resources, etc.—that are causally related in ways that explain increases in well-being or ill-being. More recently causal network theories of ill-being have been applied to depression and digital technology. Network approaches have also been applied to mental health more generally.

Diener: tripartite model of subjective well-being

Diener's tripartite model of subjective well-being is one of the most comprehensive models of well-being in psychology. It was synthesized by Diener in 1984, positing "three distinct but often related components of wellbeing: frequent positive affect, infrequent negative affect, and cognitive evaluations such as life satisfaction".

Cognitive, affective and contextual factors contribute to subjective well-being. According to Diener and Suh, subjective well-being is "...based on the idea that how each person thinks and feels about his or her life is important".

Six-factor Model of Psychological Well-being

Carol Ryff's multidimensional model of psychological well-being postulated six factors which are key for well-being:
 Self-acceptance
 Personal growth
 Purpose in life
 Environmental mastery
 Autonomy
 Positive relations with others

Corey Keyes: flourishing

According to Corey Keyes, who collaborated with Carol Ryff, mental well-being has three components, namely emotional or subjective well-being (also called hedonic well-being), psychological well-being, and social well-being (together also called eudaimonic well-being). Emotional well-being concerns subjective aspects of well-being, in concreto, feeling well, whereas psychological and social well-being concerns skills, abilities, and psychological and social functioning.

Keyes model of mental well-being has received extensive empirical support across cultures.

Seligman: positive psychology

Well-being is a central concept in positive psychology. Positive psychology is concerned with eudaimonia, "the good life", reflection about what holds the greatest value in life – the factors that contribute the most to a well-lived and fulfilling life. While not attempting a strict definition of the good life, positive psychologists agree that one must live a happy, engaged, and meaningful life in order to experience "the good life". Martin Seligman referred to "the good life" as "using your signature strengths every day to produce authentic happiness and abundant gratification".

PERMA-theory

In Flourish (2011) Seligman argued that "meaningful life" can be considered as 3 different categories. The resulting acronym is PERMA: Positive emotions, Engagement, Relationships, Meaning and purpose, and Accomplishments. It is a mnemonic for the five elements of Martin Seligman's well-being theory:
 Positive emotions include a wide range of feelings, not just happiness and joy. Included are emotions like excitement, satisfaction, pride and awe, amongst others. These emotions are frequently seen as connected to positive outcomes, such as longer life and healthier social relationships.
 Engagement refers to involvement in activities that draws and builds upon one's interests. Mihaly Csikszentmihalyi explains true engagement as flow, a feeling of intensity that leads to a sense of ecstasy and clarity. The task being done needs to call upon higher skill and be a bit difficult and challenging yet still possible. Engagement involves passion for and concentration on the task at hand and is assessed subjectively as to whether the person engaged was completely absorbed, losing self-consciousness.
 Relationships are all important in fueling positive emotions, whether they are work-related, familial, romantic, or platonic. As Dr. Christopher Peterson puts it simply, "Other people matter." Humans receive, share, and spread positivity to others through relationships. They are important not only in bad times, but good times as well. In fact, relationships can be strengthened by reacting to one another positively. It is typical that most positive things take place in the presence of other people.
 Meaning is also known as purpose, and prompts the question of "why". Discovering and figuring out a clear "why" puts everything into context from work to relationships to other parts of life. Finding meaning is learning that there is something greater than one's self. Despite potential challenges, working with meaning drives people to continue striving for a desirable goal.
 Accomplishments are the pursuit of success and mastery. Unlike the other parts of PERMA, they are sometimes pursued even when accomplishments do not result in positive emotions, meaning, or relationships. That being noted, accomplishments can activate the other elements of PERMA, such as pride, under positive emotion. Accomplishments can be individual or community-based, fun- or work-based.

Biopsychosocial model of well-being
The Biomedical approach was challenged by George Engel in 1977 as it gave little importance to various factors like beliefs, upbringing , trauma, etc. and put main emphasis on biology.

The biopsychosocial model replaces the Biomedical model of wellbeing. The Biopsychosocial model of well being emphasises the modifiable components needed for an individual to have a sense of wellbeing. These are:
 healthy environments (physical, social, cultural, and economic)
 developmental competencies (healthy identity, emotional and behavioural regulation, interpersonal skills, and problem-solving skills)
 sense of belonging
 healthy behaviours (sleep, nutrition, exercise, pleasurable and mastery activities)
 healthy coping
 resilience (recognition of one's innate resilience)
 treatment of illness (early evidence-based treatments of physical and psychological illnesses)

UK Office for National Statistics (ONS) definition
The UK ONS defines wellbeing:as having 10 broad dimensions which have been shown to matter most to people in the UK as identified through a national debate. The dimensions are:
 the natural environment,
 personal well-being,
 our relationships,
 health,
 what we do,
 where we live,
 personal finance,
 the economy,
 education and skills, and
 governance.
Personal well-being is a particularly important dimension which we define as how satisfied we are with our lives, our sense that what we do in life is worthwhile, our day to day emotional experiences (happiness and anxiety) and our wider mental wellbeing.The ONS then introduced four questions pertaining to wellbeing in their 2011 national survey of the UK population, relating to evaluative well-being, eudemonic well-being, and positive and negative affect. They later switched to referring to the construct being measured as "personal well-being".

Welfarism 
Welfarism is a theory of value based on well-being. It states that well-being is the only thing that has intrinsic value, i.e. that is good in itself and not just good as a means to something else. On this view, the value of a situation or whether one alternative is better than another only depends on the degrees of well-being of each entity affected. All other factors are relevant to value only to the extent that they have an impact on someone's well-being. The well-being in question is usually not restricted to human well-being but includes animal well-being as well.

Different versions of welfarism offer different interpretations of the exact relation between well-being and value. Pure welfarists offer the simplest approach by holding that only the overall well-being matters, for example, as the sum total of everyone's well-being. This position has been criticized in various ways. On the one hand, it has been argued that some forms of well-being, like sensory pleasures, are less valuable than other forms of well-being, like intellectual pleasures. On the other hand, certain intuitions indicate that what matters is not just the sum total but also how the individual degrees of well-being are distributed. There is a tendency to prefer equal distributions where everyone has roughly the same degree instead of unequal distributions where there is a great divide between happy and unhappy people, even if the overall well-being is the same. Another intuition concerning the distribution is that people who deserve well-being, like the morally upright, should enjoy higher degrees of well-being than the undeserving.

These criticisms are addressed by another version of welfarism: impure welfarism. Impure welfarists agree with pure welfarists that all that matters is well-being. But they allow aspects of well-being other than its overall degree to have an impact on value, e.g. how well-being is distributed. Pure welfarists sometimes argue against this approach since it seems to stray away from the core principle of welfarism: that only well-being is intrinsically valuable. But the distribution of well-being is a relation between entities and therefore not intrinsic to any of them.

Some objections based on counterexamples are directed against all forms of welfarism. They often focus on the idea that there are things other than well-being that have intrinsic value. Putative examples include the value of beauty, virtue, or justice. Such arguments are often rejected by welfarists holding that the cited things would not be valuable if they had no relation to well-being. This is often extended to a positive argument in favor of welfarism based on the claim that nothing would be good or bad in a world without sentient beings. In this sense, welfarists may agree that the cited examples are valuable in some form but disagree that they are intrinsically valuable.

Some authors see welfarism as including the ethical thesis that morality fundamentally depends on well-being. On this view, welfarism is also committed to the consequentialist claim that actions, policies, or rules should be evaluated based on how their consequences affect everyone's well-being.

Global studies

Research on positive psychology, well-being, eudaimonia and happiness, and the theories of Diener, Ryff, Keyes and Seligmann covers a broad range of levels and topics, including "the biological, personal, relational, institutional, cultural, and global dimensions of life". The World Happiness Report series provide annual updates on the global status of subjective well-being. A global study using data from 166 nations, provided a country ranking of psycho-social well-being. The latter study showed that subjective well-being and psycho-social well-being (i.e. eudaimonia) measures capture distinct constructs and are both needed for a comprehensive understanding of mental well-being.

Gallup's wellbeing research finds that 33% of workers globally are thriving, 55% struggling and 11% suffering.

Well-being as a political goal

Both the UK and New Zealand have begun to focus on population well-being within their political aims.

See also
 Gross National Well-being
 Happiness economics
 Happiness
 Life satisfaction
 Fundamental human needs
 Quality of life
 Subjective well-being
 Welfare

Notes

References

Sources

Further reading
 Routledge Handbook of the Philosophy of Well-Being

External links

 Theories of Well-Being, in William MacAskill & Richard Yetter-Chappell (2021), Introduction to Utilitarianism.
 
 PhilPapers: 'Well-being', 'Desire-satisfaction accounts', 'Objective accounts', 'Hedonistic accounts', 'Perfectionist accounts'

16th-century neologisms
 
Welfare economics
Quality of life
Positive psychology